Championa is a genus of beetles in the family Cerambycidae, containing the following species:

 Championa aliciae Noguera & Chemsak, 1997
 Championa aurata Bates, 1880
 Championa badeni Bates, 1892
 Championa chemsaki Martins & Napp, 1992
Championa chihuahuaensis Heffern, Santos-Silva & Nascimento, 2021
 Championa ctenostomoides Bates, 1885
 Championa elegans Chemsak, 1967
Championa santossilvai Bezark, 2019
 Championa suturalis Chemsak, 1967
 Championa westcotti Noguera & Chemsak, 1997
Championa zaragozai Heffern, Santos-Silva & Nascimento, 2021

References

Heteropsini